The Byram Formation is a geologic formation in Alabama. It preserves fossils.

See also

 List of fossiliferous stratigraphic units in Alabama
 Paleontology in Alabama

References
 

Paleogene Alabama
Paleogene Mississippi